TE Connectivity is an American Swiss-domiciled technology company that designs and manufactures connectors and sensors for several industries, such as automotive, industrial equipment, data communication systems, aerospace, defense, medical, oil and gas, consumer electronics and energy.

TE Connectivity has a global workforce of 89,000 employees, including more than 8,000 engineers. The company serves customers in approximately 140 countries.

History

In 1941, Aircraft and Marine Products (AMP) was founded with solderless electrical connections for quick and removable wire connection used for aircraft and ships.  After the war time boom the company had to adapt to post war economy and in 1956 the name was changed to AMP Incorporated when it incorporated. In 1999, Tyco International acquired American electronics connector manufacturer AMP Incorporated.

In September 2002 the CEO (L. Dennis Kozlowski) and CFO (Mark H. Swartz) of Tyco International Ltd. were indicted on charges including fraud, racketeering, stock manipulation, and more, amounting to more than $600 million dollars of theft.

In July 2007, Tyco separated into three publicly independent companies, Covidien Ltd (formerly Tyco Healthcare), Tyco Electronics Ltd, and Tyco International Ltd (formerly Tyco Fire & Security and Tyco Engineered Products & Services (TFS/TEPS)).

On March 10, 2011, Tyco Electronics Ltd changed its name to TE Connectivity Ltd, which the company said felt more relevant to its position as a connectivity and sensor component manufacturer.

On August 28, 2015, TE Connectivity announced that it has completed the sale of its broadband-networks business to CommScope Holding Co. for about US$3 billion.

Products and services
TE Connectivity's product portfolio is focused on connectors and sensors that are made to withstand harsh environments. The company operates three primary segments:

Communications 
TE Connectivity's communications segment supplies electronic components for home appliances, including products for washers, dryers, refrigerators, air conditioners, dishwashers, cooking appliances, water heaters, and microwaves.

Transportation 
The transportation segment includes four business units: automotive, industrial and commercial transportation, application tooling, and sensors.
 
TE's products are used by the automotive industry for body and chassis systems, convenience applications, driver information, infotainment, miniaturization, motor and powertrain applications, and safety and security systems. Hybrid and electronic mobility include in-vehicle technologies, battery technologies, and charging. In addition, TE's products are used for on- and off-highway vehicles and recreational transportation, including construction, agriculture, buses, and other vehicles.

TE offers sensors for industries including automotive, industrial equipment, commercial transportation, medical, aerospace and defense, and consumer applications.

Industrial 
The industrial segment supplies products that connect and distribute power, data, and signals.
Products are used in factory automation and process control systems such as industrial controls, robotics, human machine interface, industrial communication, and power distribution. TE's intelligent building products are used to connect lighting, HVAC, elevators/escalators, and security. Its rail products are used in high-speed trains, metros, light rail vehicles, locomotives, and signaling switching equipment. Also, its products are used by the solar and lighting industry.

TE's products are used by the medical industry in imaging, diagnostic, therapeutic, surgical, tubing, and minimally invasive interventional applications.
 
TE Connectivity provides components for the commercial aerospace industry from the initial stages of aircraft design to aftermarket support. TE's defense products include ruggedized electronic interconnects serving military aviation, marine, and ground vehicles including electronic warfare and space systems. Its oil and gas products include cables and electronics used for subsea environments in the offshore oil and gas and civil marine industries and in shipboard, subsea, and sonar applications.

See also 
 F crimp
 MICTOR

References

External links 

Companies listed on the New York Stock Exchange
Electronics companies of Switzerland
Swiss companies established in 2007
Electronics companies established in 2007
Corporate spin-offs
Schaffhausen
Tax inversions